Dismas Hataš (1 December 1724 – 13 October 1777) was a Bohemian composer and violinist of the early classical period.

Life 
Hataš was born in Vysoké Mýto into a musical family. Many of his relatives were cantors and organists in Bohemia. In May 1751 he married the singer Anna Franziska Benda, the sister of Franz and Jiří Antonín Benda, and in October of that year was recommended by Jiří Antonín for a position as a violinist in the court orchestra in Gotha. He was to keep this position for the rest of his life.

In 1756 his son Jindřich Krištof Hataš was born, whom he taught to play the violin, and who later became a composer. From December 1768 to early 1769 he performed with his wife and colleagues from Gotha in four concerts in the Netherlands.

Dismas' younger brother, Jan Václav Hataš (1727–1752) was also a composer.

Works 
Hataš' compositional style is typical of that which prevailed in Northern Germany in the middle of the 18th century. It preserves many baroque idioms while absorbing many classical developments which were already common in other parts of Europe. His output includes:
 3 sonatas for violin and basso continuo (in C major ; G major ; A major)
 6 sonatas for violin and basso continuo (lost)
 Concerto for flute, strings and basso continuo in G major, (KatGro 39, D-Rtt Hattasch 1)
 Sinfonia in E major (manuscript in Moravská zemská knihovna v Brně)
 Sinfonia in D major for flute solo, 2 horns and strings
 Sinfonia in D major for 2 horns/trumpets, timpani and strings (Also attributed to Georg Christoph Wagenseil)
 Offertorium O vos chori caelestis for four voices and orchestra
 Lied Noch kannt' ich nicht der Liebe Macht for voice and piano

Further reading 
 Alfred Baumgartner: Propyläen Welt der Musik. Band 2: Cools – Hauer. Propyläen-Verlag, Berlin 1989, S. 481.
 Franz Lorenz: Die Musikerfamilie Benda (Band 2: Georg Anton Benda), 1971, de Gruyter Berlin, Pages 78 and 79.
 Vojtíšková L.: Manželé Hatašovi mezi českými emigranty v Gótě, in sborník Labores musei in Benátky nad Jizerou IV (1968), 17–22

References

1724 births
1777 deaths
People from Vysoké Mýto
18th-century Bohemian musicians
Czech expatriates in Germany
Czech violinists
German violinists
German male violinists
Czech male classical composers
Czech Classical-period composers
German male classical composers
Czech classical violinists
German classical violinists
Male classical violinists
18th-century classical composers
18th-century German composers
18th-century German male musicians
German classical composers